The Tokachi 24 Hours (十勝24時間レース) was an endurance race held at the Tokachi International Speedway between 1994 and 2008 for GT and production cars. For each year of the event, the Tokachi 24 Hour was part of the Super Taikyu championship, however cars and teams from Super GT were able to participate in the event; where most recently in 2007 a Hybrid GT500 Toyota Supra HV-R was able to win the race overall.

For each race between 1995 and 2002, and along with the 2007 and 2008 races, the 'Grand Prix' layout of 5.091km was used, for all the other races, the 'Clubman' layout of 3.408km was used.

List of winners

External links
Tokachi 24 Hours website 

Endurance motor racing
Sports car races
Touring car races